Propsteikirche means provost or abbey church in German.

Churches named Propsteikirche include:
Propsteikirche (Königsberg)
Worms Cathedral
Propsteikirche St. Laurentius, Kloster Wedinghausen, Arnsberg
Propsteikirche St. Ludgerus, Billerbeck
Propsteikirche St. Peter und Paul, Bochum
Propsteikirche Maria Himmelfahrt, Bolzano
Propsteikirche St. Petrus und Andreas, Brilon
Propsteikirche St. Peter und Paul, Dessau
Propsteikirche St. Johannes Baptist, Dortmund
Propsteikirche St. Augustinus, Gelsenkirchen
Propsteikirche St. Urbanus, Buer, Germany 
Propsteipfarrkirche St. Mariä Himmelfahrt, Jülich
Propsteikirche St. Nikolaus, Kiel
Propsteikirche St. Remigius, Kusel
Propsteikirche St. Trinitatis, Leipzig
Propsteikirche Herz Jesu, Lübeck
Propsteikirche St. Anna, Schwerin
Propsteikirche St.-Patrokli-Dom, Soest
Propsteikirche St. Georg, Vechta
Propsteikirche Sankt Josef, Verden an der Aller
Propsteikirche St. Gertrud von Brabant, Wattenscheid

German words and phrases